Howard Douglas Creek is a stream in Alberta, Canada.

Howard Douglas Creek has the name of Howard Douglas, a national park official.

See also
List of rivers of Alberta

References

Rivers of Alberta